The National Low Income Housing Coalition (NLIHC) is a non-profit organization dedicated to ending America's affordable housing crisis. It aims to expand and preserve housing for people with extremely low incomes. NLIHC provides current information and data on affordable housing, and formulates policy and increases awareness on housing needs and strategies.

History
NLIHC was founded in 1974 by Cushing Dolbeare, a housing policy analyst and consultant. Initially named the Ad Hoc Low Income Housing Coalition and incorporated as the National Low Income Housing Coalition five years later, Dolbeare created the organization in response to Nixon's 1973 moratorium on federal housing subsidies. To Dolbeare, the lack of affordable housing was for poor people a chronic problem with few available solutions. In the organization's first years, it operated out of Dolbeare's Capitol Hill home. Similar interest groups at the time include the National Tenants Organization.

Since the early years of the 2000s, NLIHC was active in leading housing advocates in the creation of a federally funded housing trust fund. The National Housing Trust Fund was passed as part of the Housing and Economic Recovery Act of 2008. In 2016, the trust fund started providing grants to states to increase the supply of rental housing for extremely low income households. NLIHC continues to advocate for increased financial support to the National Housing Trust Fund.

Leadership

Dolbeare headed the organization from 1977 to 1984 and 1993 to 1994. In 2014, NLIHC commemorated its 40 years of operations with the announcement of a new leadership Council of former board chairs, executive directors, and founding members. In 2016, Diane Yentel, who worked as an NLIHC analyst in her first Washington, D.C., job, became president of the organization. Yentel succeeded Sheila Crowley, who retired after leading the organization for more than 17 years.

Activities
NLIHC has developed a national database on subsidized and federally assisted housing. HUD provides data on the number of rental assistance and insurance program it administers, which NLIHC combines with data on properties supported by the Department of Agriculture or low income housing tax credits. Around the 1980s the coalition was affiliated with the Low Income Housing Information Service.

The organization's annual publication, Out of Reach, developed a formula called the "housing wage" that spotlights the gap between income and housing costs.  The widely cited report identifies the number of hours someone earning minimum wage would have to work to afford a two bedroom house in every jurisdiction in the country.

See also
 Housing insecurity in the United States

References

Further reading
 . (Describes the coalition)

External links
The National Low Income Housing Coalition website

Housing organizations in the United States
Organizations established in 1974
Non-profit organizations based in Washington, D.C.